The Widforss Trail is a hiking trail located at the North Rim of the Grand Canyon National Park in the U.S. state of Arizona. The Widforss Trail runs from the North Rim Village through the forest to emerge at Widforss Point, a narrow, wooded promontory. 

Widforss Trail was named for Gunnar Widforss, an artist specializing in American National Park landscape paintings.

See also
 Grand Canyon
 List of trails in Grand Canyon National Park

External links

 National Park Service brochure, Widforss Trail
 Topographic map including Widforss Trail
 Widforss Trail description

Grand Canyon, North Rim
Hiking trails in Grand Canyon National Park